The FIBT World Championships 1970 took place in St. Moritz, Switzerland for the record eleventh time. The Swiss city had hosted the event previously in 1931 (Four-man), 1935 (Four-man), 1937 (Four-man), 1938 (Two-man), 1939 (Two-man), 1947, 1955, 1957, 1959, and 1965.

Two man bobsleigh

The Swiss earned their first championships medal since 1960.

Four man bobsleigh

Medal table

References
 Les Sports Info
2-Man bobsleigh World Champions
4-Man bobsleigh World Champions

1970
1970 in Swiss sport
Sport in St. Moritz
1970 in bobsleigh
International sports competitions hosted by Switzerland
Bobsleigh in Switzerland